April Fabb (22 April 1955 – disappeared 8 April 1969) was an English schoolgirl who disappeared on 8 April 1969, when aged 13, between the villages of Metton and Roughton in Norfolk, England, United Kingdom.

Background
At around 1:40 p.m. on Tuesday 8 April 1969, Fabb left her home at 3 Council Houses, Metton to visit her sister's house in Roughton. Travelling by bicycle, she had a packet of ten cigarettes, 5½d and a handkerchief in the saddlebag, and was planning to deliver the cigarettes as a birthday present to her brother-in-law. Just after 2:00 p.m., she was seen cycling along the country road towards Roughton.

At around 2:15 pm, her blue and white bicycle was seen lying in a field near Metton by two Ordnance Survey workers; a passing motorist later took it to a Cromer police station.

Search
Despite an extensive police investigation and search of the surrounding area, no trace of Fabb was found, and the reason for her disappearance remains unknown. Her disappearance led to the biggest police search operation the UK had seen, with the authorities having searched 400 houses, conducted hundreds of interviews and recorded close to 2,000 statements since 1969.

Further searches for Fabb, including the use of thermal imaging cameras in 1997 and the excavation of a well in 2010, failed to produce any fresh leads.

At the time of the disappearance of Genette Tate in August 1978, Norfolk Constabulary pointed out to Devon and Cornwall Police that there were strong similarities with the Fabb case. Both cases are unsolved and no link between the two has ever been proven.

Child murderer Robert Black was questioned over the two disappearances.

In popular culture 
In 2018, a play called Into Thin Air was inspired by Fabb's disappearance.

See also
List of people who disappeared

References

Further reading
 
 Morson, Maurice (1995, rev: 2007, further rev: September 2012). The Lost Years: The Story of April Fabb. Redbridge Books. .

External links
2018 Norfolk News article pertaining to the ongoing investigation into the disappearance of April Fabb

April Fabb - 50th anniversary Norfolk Police

1955 births
1960s missing person cases
1969 in England
Missing English children
Missing person cases in England
People from North Norfolk (district)
Place of birth missing (living people)
Living people
20th-century British people